Atalanta is a statue by the English sculptor Francis Derwent Wood. It shows a naked woman standing in a contrapposto position, glancing to her left, with her left hand by her side and right hand raised to her shoulder. The subject is Atalanta, a virgin huntress from Greek mythology; she may be preparing for the foot race she used as an obstacle to prevent suitors securing a marriage.

The bronze statue in London received a Grade II listing in 1969.  The original casting was stolen in 1991 and replaced by a replica.  Nearby are David Wynne's Boy with a Dolphin and Edward Bainbridge Copnall 1971 statue of David, a copy of the sculpture by Wood atop the Machine Gun Corps Memorial.

References
 Francis Derwent Wood Memorial, Embankment Gardens, National Heritage List for England, Historic England
 Atalanta, Statue, Chelsea Embankment, Public Monuments and Sculpture Association
 Full-length statue of Atalanta by Francis Derwent Wood, ArtFund
 Sculptures from Academy architecture, 1904–1908. A collection of all the sculptures published in vols. 25–34 of Academy Architecture, p. 111.

1907 sculptures
1909 sculptures
Marble sculptures in the United Kingdom
Collection of Manchester Art Gallery
1929 sculptures
Bronze sculptures in the United Kingdom
Monuments and memorials in London
Outdoor sculptures in London
Statues in London
Grade II listed buildings in the Royal Borough of Kensington and Chelsea
Sculptures of women in the United Kingdom
Sculptures of classical mythology
Nude sculptures in the United Kingdom